Apotomops is a genus of moths belonging to the family Tortricidae.

Species
Apotomops boliviana  Brown & Razowski, 2003
Apotomops carchicola  Razowski & Becker, 2000
Apotomops rhampha Razowski & Wojtusiak, 2008
Apotomops sololana  Razowski, 1999
Apotomops spomotopa  Brown & Razowski, 2003
Apotomops texasana  Blanchard & Knudson, 1984
Apotomops wellingtoniana  Kearfott, 1907

References

 , 1986, Pan-Pacif. Ent. 62: 396.
 , 2005, World Catalogue of Insects 5
 , 2000: Revision of the New World Euliini - genus Bonagota Razowski, with notes on Apotomops Powell & Obraztsov (Lepidoptera: Tortricidae). Polish Journal of Entomology 69 (1): 65-76.

External links
tortricidae.com

Euliini
Tortricidae genera